Jeonbuk Science College is a junior college in Jeongeup, North Jeolla Province, South Korea founded in 1993. The current president is Kwon E Dam (권이담).

Academics

History

See also
List of universities and colleges in South Korea
Education in South Korea

External links

Junior colleges in South Korea
Universities and colleges in North Jeolla Province
Educational institutions established in 1993
1993 establishments in South Korea